Absalom Baird (August 20, 1824 – June 14, 1905) was a career United States Army officer who distinguished himself as a Union Army general in the American Civil War. Baird received the Medal of Honor for his military actions.

Early life
Baird was born in Washington, Pennsylvania. He graduated from the preparatory department of Washington College (now Washington & Jefferson College) in 1841.  He enrolled in the United States Military Academy and graduated in 1849, ranked ninth in a class of 43. From 1852 to 1859, he was a mathematics instructor at West Point, where one of his students was James McNeill Whistler. From 1859 to 1861, he served in Texas and Virginia.

Civil War
When the Civil War broke out in 1861, Baird was promoted to brevet captain. He fought at the First Battle of Bull Run under Brig. Gen. Daniel Tyler. On November 12, 1861, Baird was promoted to major in the Regular Army while serving as an assistant inspector general. He became chief of staff to Maj. Gen. Erasmus D. Keyes during the first part of the Siege of Yorktown, where his service earned him a further promotion to brigadier general of U.S. Volunteers on April 30, 1862, to rank from April 28, 1862.

In April 1862, Baird took command of the 27th Brigade, 7th Division in the Army of the Ohio under Maj. Gen. Don Carlos Buell. Baird helped secure the Cumberland Gap in June 1862 under George W. Morgan. He commanded the 3rd Division, Army of Kentucky where his troops fared poorly in the battle of Thompson's Station though Baird was not personally involved.  His troops were present at the battle of the Harpeth River before being assimilated into the Army of the Cumberland. Baird's division became the 1st Division of Maj. Gen. George Henry Thomas's XIV Corps. It was in this post that he won fame for his heroic efforts at the Battle of Chickamauga and the Chattanooga Campaign. Baird won a brevet promotion to colonel in Regular Army for Chattanooga. In the Atlanta Campaign, Baird led a brigade charge in the Battle of Jonesborough which earned him the Medal of Honor. He led his division in Maj. Gen. William T. Sherman's March to the Sea and Carolinas Campaign. Baird led his division in the Battle of Bentonville in the latter campaign.
 
On January 23, 1865, President Abraham Lincoln nominated Baird for appointment to the brevet grade of major general of volunteers, to rank from September 1, 1864, and the U.S. Congress confirmed the award on February 14, 1865. On April 10, 1866, President Andrew Johnson nominated Baird for appointment as brevet brigadier general in the Regular Army, to rank from March 13, 1865, and the U.S. Senate confirmed the appointment on May 4, 1866. On July 17, 1866, President Andrew Johnson nominated Baird for appointment as brevet major general in the regular U.S. Army, to rank from March 13, 1865, and the U.S. Senate confirmed the appointment on July 23, 1866. Baird was mustered out of the volunteer service on September 1, 1866.

Postbellum life

Following the war, Baird served as commander of the department of Louisiana. He was appointed an assistant inspector general with the grade of lieutenant colonel on June 17, 1867. He was appointed Inspector General of the Army on March 11, 1885, and was promoted to a full grade brigadier general on September 22, 1885. In 1887, he traveled to France to observe military maneuvers, and was named a Commander of the Légion d'honneur. Baird retired from the Army on August 20, 1888, having reached the mandatory retirement age of 64.

On April 22, 1896, Baird was awarded the Medal of Honor for leading "an assault upon the enemy's works" at the Battle of Jonesborough on September 1, 1864.  He was also a veteran companion of the Military Order of the Loyal Legion of the United States and a member of the General Society of Colonial Wars.

He died at Relay, Maryland near Baltimore, Maryland, and is buried in section 1, lot 55, at Arlington National Cemetery, Arlington, Virginia.

Medal of Honor citation
 Rank and organization: Brigadier General, U.S. Volunteers.
 Place and date: At Jonesboro, Georgia, September 1, 1864. 
 Entered service at: Washington, Pennsylvania.
 Birth: Washington, Pennsylvania.
 Date of issue: April 22, 1896.

Citation:

Voluntarily led a detached brigade in an assault upon the enemy's works.

See also

 List of Medal of Honor recipients
 List of American Civil War Medal of Honor recipients: A–F
 List of American Civil War generals (Union)

Notes

References
 Eicher, John H., and David J. Eicher, Civil War High Commands. Stanford: Stanford University Press, 2001. .
 
 American National Biography, vol. 1, pp. 906–907.

External links
 ANC Explorer

1824 births
1905 deaths
People from Washington, Pennsylvania
Burials at Arlington National Cemetery
United States Military Academy alumni
Union Army generals
United States Army Medal of Honor recipients
Washington & Jefferson College alumni
Commandeurs of the Légion d'honneur
Inspectors General of the United States Army
American Civil War recipients of the Medal of Honor
General Society of Colonial Wars
Military personnel from Pennsylvania